Winson Green, Outer Circle tram stop is a tram stop in Winson Green, Birmingham England. It was opened on 31 May 1999 and is situated on West Midlands Metro Line 1. Its name is derived from its connection with the Outer Circle bus route.

The pedestrian approach to the stop is decorated by Tim Tolkien's James Watt's Mad Machine.

It is one of only a few Midland Metro stops to have an island platform, rather than two side platforms. This is due to a lack of space at the site. The Birmingham to Worcester railway line runs alongside, but the stop is served only by trams, as there are no railway platforms. In addition the railway line between the Stour Valley Line and former Grand Junction Line crosses over the lines just south of the tram stop.

Services
Mondays to Fridays, Midland Metro services in each direction between Birmingham and Wolverhampton run at six to eight-minute intervals during the day, and at fifteen-minute intervals during the evenings and on Sundays. They run at eight minute intervals on Saturdays.

References

 Article on this Metro stop from Rail Around Birmingham & the West Midlands
 This stop's entry on thetrams.co.uk

Transport in Birmingham, West Midlands
West Midlands Metro stops
Railway stations in Great Britain opened in 1999